Nataphon Srisamutnak (born 23 October) is a Thai volleyball coach He is the coach of the Thailand women's national volleyball team that competed at the 2014 Asian Games.

Royal decoration 
 2013 -  Commander (Third Class) of The Most Exalted Order of the White Elephant

References

1967 births
Living people
Nataphon Srisamutnak
Nataphon Srisamutnak
Place of birth missing (living people)
Southeast Asian Games medalists in volleyball
Nataphon Srisamutnak
Competitors at the 1985 Southeast Asian Games